The Port of Brownsville is a deep water seaport in Brownsville, at the southern tip of Texas.

Geography
The port is the southern terminus of the Gulf Intracoastal Waterway.

Brownsville Ship Channel
The deep water Brownsville Ship Channel, to/from the Gulf of Mexico, passes between Padre Island and Brazos Island, Barrier islands of the Gulf Coast.  The channel also passes the old harbor of Los Brazos de Santiago, the landing place of the Spanish explorer Alonso Álvarez de Pineda in 1519 and subsequent colonizers from the Viceroyalty of New Spain.

The channel is dredged to handle ships of  draft at high tide, and can support ships up to  overall length and a  beam.

Service
The port serves South Texas and, via rail connections, much of northeast Mexico including the large industrial city of Monterrey in Nuevo León state.

The Port of Brownsville is governed by the Brownsville Navigation District, a political subdivision of the State of Texas.  The District is guided by an elected Board of Commissioners that establishes the policies, rules, rates and regulations of the Port and approves all contractual obligations.

See also

References

Brownsville
Intracoastal Waterway
Transportation in Brownsville, Texas
Lower Rio Grande Valley
Ship breaking